Cardopatium is a genus of flowering plants in the family Asteraceae. They are native to the central and eastern Mediterranean region.

 Species
 Cardopatium amethystinum Spach - Algeria, Tunisia 
 Cardopatium corymbosum  (L.) Pers. - Greece, Italy, Macedonia, Turkey, Cyprus, Lebanon, Syria, Israel, Palestine, Jordan, Algeria

References

Asteraceae genera
Cynareae